Geastrum lloydianum is a species of fungus belonging to the genus Geastrum, or earthstar fungi. Described as new to science in 1906 by Johannes Rick, it is found in South America.

References

lloydianum
Inedible fungi
Fungi of South America
Fungi described in 1859
Taxa named by Johannes Rick